Brigette Lacquette (born November 10, 1992) is a Canadian ice hockey player, currently playing for the Calgary section of the PWHPA and the Canadian national team, playing defence. She participated at the 2015 IIHF Women's World Championship. In the autumn of 2015, Lacquette joined the Calgary Inferno of the CWHL.

In 2018, Lacquette became the first First Nations woman to play for the Canadian women's Olympic hockey team. To honour her accomplishment, Lacquette's Olympic hockey stick was included in the diversity exhibit in the Hockey Hall of Fame in 2018. Along with Sarah Nurse and Hanna Bunton, Lacquette joined them on the cover (dated June 2021) of Elle Canada.

In December 2021, Lacquette was also hired by the Chicago Blackhawks as a scout covering players in clubs of the Western Hockey League.

Early life
Brigette Lacquette is the first First Nations hockey player to be named to Canada’s National Women’s Team. She recognizes that makes her a role model for young First Nations athletes, especially girls who play hockey, but that is a job she is happy to accept. Lacquette first joined the National Women’s U18 Team in August 2008. She went on to win silver and gold at the 2009 and 2010 IIHF U18 Women’s World Champions.

Lacquette first played with the National Women’s Team at the 2013 Four Nations Cup, helping Canada win the gold medal. She was centralized with the team in the leadup to Sochi 2014 but was not selected to the final Olympic roster. Lacquette made her IIHF Women’s World Championship debut in 2015, winning the first of two back-to-back silver medals with Canada. She made her Olympic debut at PyeongChang 2018, helping Canada win the silver medal.

Lacquette played collegiately at the University of Minnesota-Duluth. In 2011-12 she was second in scoring among team defencemen and was named to the WCHA All-Rookie Team. After graduation, she joined Calgary of the CWHL, who had selected her 24th overall in the 2015 Draft. She won the 2015-16 Clarkson Cup with Calgary and helped the Inferno return to the Clarkson Cup final in 2016-17.

Lacquette grew up in the remote Métis community of Mallard, Manitoba. Her father is from the O-Chi-Chak Ko Sipi First Nation of Manitoba, while her mother is from the Cote First Nation in Saskatchewan. Lacquette has a sister named Tara and a brother named Taren, both of whom play hockey.

Lacquette began skating at the age of four, and was soon introduced to hockey by her father and cousins. Since there were no hockey rinks in Mallard, Lacquette's father built one in their family yard. By the time she was five, Lacquette knew she wanted to play in organized hockey, and her father began taking her to the nearest indoor rink, located in the community of Winnipegosis.

As she grew up, Lacquette began facing racism at hockey games. At the age of twelve, she played a tournament in Winnipeg where she encountered taunts such as "dirty Indian" and "go back to the reserve". Hateful comments have come from opponents, tournament fans, parents of hockey players, and even a few of her own teammates. Despite being tempted to quit at times, Lacquette was supported by her father and decided to continue playing hockey. Lacquette's father has expressed pride at his daughter's perseverance: "She basically kicked that door over and knocked it down and it's not a barrier anymore in her life, and that's something that's important for not only her but anybody who's faced a barrier in their life."

Playing career

University and NCAA teams
Lacquette has played for the University of Manitoba Bisons and at the NCAA level at the University of Minnesota-Duluth. Shannon Miller, a former head hockey coach at the University of Minnesota Duluth, has described Lacquette as "the most naturally talented player to ever come through our program". Lacquette was the first Ojibway/Anishnabe in UMD hockey history.

CWHL
Appearing with the Calgary Inferno in the 2016 Clarkson Cup finals, Lacquette earned an assist as the Inferno emerged victorious in a convincing 8–3 final. In 2019, Lacquette led all CWHL players in an online vote, gaining the opportunity to serve as a captain at the 4th Canadian Women's Hockey League All-Star Game.

Olympics
In 2014, Lacquette was in the running for the Canadian Olympic hockey team, but was a late cut.

In 2018, Lacquette became the first First Nations woman to join the Canadian women's Olympic hockey team, set to play defence at the 2018 Winter Olympics.

Lacquette's first appearance with the Canadian Women's National Team was in 2013 at the Four Nations Cup tournament held in Lake Placid, United States.

In 2015, Lacquette played her first IIHF Women's World Championship with team Canada in Sweden, where Canada finished second to the United States.

Volunteer work
Lacquette is a partner athlete with the sports mentorship organization Classroom Champions. As a participant of the organization's "Circle" program, which connects athletes and youth of Indigenous heritage, Lacquette has provided mentorship to children from the Piitoayis (Eagle Lodge) Family School in Inglewood, Calgary.

Inspiration
Lacquettes role model growing up was fellow aboriginal hockey athlete, Jordin Tootoo.

Lacquette embraces her title as a role model to young First Nations kids across Canada. "I'm super excited to be that role model for those kids. Growing up I really didn't have that female role model to look up to," said Lacquette. "It's just very special for me to be that role model for young First Nation girls across Canada, Indigenous kids across Canada. I'm just super excited to be that person for them."

Career stats

Team Canada
In progress

Awards and honors
Top Defenceman for her performance at the 2010 IIHF World Women's Under-18 Championships. Where she also helped lead Canada to its first gold medal at the Under-18 Championships after assisting the overtime winner.
2016 Clarkson Cup champion
2019 Indspire Award, Sports

References

External links
 
 
 
 
 
 

1992 births
Living people
Calgary Inferno players
Canadian expatriate ice hockey players in the United States
Canadian women's ice hockey defencemen
Clarkson Cup champions
First Nations sportspeople
Ice hockey people from Manitoba
Ice hockey players at the 2018 Winter Olympics
Medalists at the 2018 Winter Olympics
Minnesota Duluth Bulldogs women's ice hockey players
Olympic ice hockey players of Canada
Olympic medalists in ice hockey
Olympic silver medalists for Canada
Sportspeople from Dauphin, Manitoba
Professional Women's Hockey Players Association players
Manitoba Bisons women's ice hockey players
First Nations women
First Nations sportswomen